The 1970 Michigan gubernatorial election was held on November 3, 1970. Republican William Milliken won the election, defeating Democratic nominee Sander Levin.

Primaries 
The primary elections occurred on August 4, 1970.

Republican primary

Democratic primary

American Independent primary

General election 

Major party candidates
William G. Milliken, Republican
Sander M. Levin, Democratic

Major party running mates
James H. Brickley, Republican
Edward H. McNamara, Democratic

Other candidates
James L. McCormick, American Independent
George Bouse, Socialist Workers
James Horvath, Socialist Labor

Other running mates
Robert E. Cauley, American Independent
Evelyn Kirsch, Socialist Workers
W. Clifford Bentley, Socialist Labor

Results overview

Results by county

Notes

References 

Michigan
Michigan gubernatorial elections
November 1970 events in the United States
1970 Michigan elections